Tapio Schneider is a climate scientist and a professor of environmental science and engineering at the California Institute of Technology. His research is focused on understanding how the turbulent dynamics of the atmosphere, from clouds to large-scale weather systems, shape Earth's climate. Ultimately, his goal is to develop a set of physical laws that govern climate.

Awards and recognitions 
 2008: Houghton Lecturer, Massachusetts Institute of Technology
 2008: Discover Magazine, “20 Best Brains Under 40” 
 2005-2010: David and Lucile Packard Fellow 
 2004-2006: Alfred P. Sloan Foundation, Research Fellow
 2004 James R. Holton Junior Scientist Award, American Geophysical Union

References

External links 
 Tapio Schneider's homepage

Living people
American meteorologists
American climatologists
1972 births